Tom Jones is an up-coming four-part television miniseries reimagining Henry Fielding's 1749 novel The History of Tom Jones, A Foundling. It is directed by Georgia Parris and adapted by Gwyneth Hughes, with Solly McLeod playing the eponymous hero Tom Jones. The show will premiere on PBS in the United States from 30 April, 2023.

Cast
Solly McLeod as Tom
Sophie Wilde as Sophia
Hannah Waddingham as Lady Bellaston
James Fleet as Squire Allworthy
Shirley Henderson as Aunt Western 
Alun Armstrong as Squire Western 
Pearl Mackie as Honour
Tamzin Merchant as Aunt Harriet
Julian Rhind-Tutt as Fitzpatrick
Susannah Fielding as Mrs. Waters
Daniel Rigby as Partridge
James Wilbraham as Blifil
Felicity Montagu as Bridget Allworthy
Janine Duvitski as Mrs. Wilkins
Dean Lennox Kelly as Black George
Lucy Fallon as Molly

Production
Masterpiece, ITV and Mammoth Screen were announced as teaming up for the Gwyneth Hughes adaption of the Henry Fielding novel in 2021 with Solly McLeod and Sophie Wilde announced in the main roles. Producer and adapter Gwyneth Hughes called the original text “the mother of all romcoms”. The miniseries was entirely filmed in Northern Ireland, including Gracehill, Ballymena and Belfast. In November 2021 it was announced that Hannah Waddingham had joined the cast.

Broadcast
The series will premiere in the US on PBS in the spring of 2023, in four parts on Sundays from April 30 to May 21, 2023 at 9pm (ET).

References

External links
 

Television shows filmed in the United Kingdom
Television shows filmed in Northern Ireland
2023 British television series debuts
2023 British television series endings
2020s British drama television series
2020s British television miniseries
ITV television dramas
English-language television shows
Television series by Mammoth Screen